Weightlifting was contested at the 2013 Summer Universiade from July 7 to 12 at the Ak Bure Multipurpose Sports Complex and the Batyr Sports Complex in Kazan, Russia.

Medal summary
On August 8, 2016, the International Weightlifting Federation announced the disqualification of several athletes who participated in the competition due to the retesting of the anti-doping exams, with which several medals are redistributed.

Medal table

Men's events

Women's events

References

External links
2013 Summer Universiade – Weightlifting
Results book

2013 in weightlifting
2013 Summer Universiade events
Weightlifting at the Summer Universiade
Universiade